Alex Holub (born 15 March 2000) is a Slovak professional footballer who plays for Pohronie in the 2. Liga, on loan from Ružomberok, as a defender.

Club career

MFK Ružomberok
Holub made his Fortuna Liga debut for Ružomberok against iClinic Sereď on 15 February 2020.

References

External links
 MFK Ružomberok official profile 
 Futbalnet profile 
  
 

2000 births
Living people
People from Tvrdošín
Sportspeople from the Žilina Region
Slovak footballers
Slovakia youth international footballers
Association football defenders
MFK Ružomberok players
MFK Tatran Liptovský Mikuláš players
FC Rohožník players
FK Pohronie players
Slovak Super Liga players
2. Liga (Slovakia) players